Holly Bend, also known as Hollywood, is a historic plantation house located near Huntersville, Mecklenburg County, North Carolina. It was built between 1795 and 1800, and is a two-story, five bay by two bay, frame dwelling with Federal style design elements. It has gable roof, brick exterior end chimneys, and a one-story, full-width, hip roof porch.

It was listed on the National Register of Historic Places in 1972.

References

Plantation houses in North Carolina
Houses on the National Register of Historic Places in North Carolina
Federal architecture in North Carolina
Houses completed in 1829
Houses in Charlotte, North Carolina
National Register of Historic Places in Mecklenburg County, North Carolina